Tickle Cove Pond was written by Mark Walker (songwriter), a fisherman and songwriter who lived in Tickle Cove, Bonavista Bay in Newfoundland, Canada during the late 19th century. This song is prized locally for the beauty and wit of the lyrics, which turn a mundane event into an act of heroism. Although most Newfoundland songs are passed on by ear alone, in recent years it has been recorded by  Sean Sullivan & Rob Slaney (in Our Songs Vol. 2: Favorite Songs of Newfoundland & Labrador), Ron Hynes (in Another Time: The Songs Of Newfoundland), by Great Big Sea, who have released an album entitled The Hard and the Easy and by Wakami Wailers on the album River Through the Pines. They have also released a DVD with a companion CD entitled Courage & Patience & Grit in reference to a verse from Tickle Cove Pond. In addition, this song has been recorded by a St. John's Traditional Folk group called Connemara.  It was also recorded by the Vermont-based ensemble Nightingale.

Additional Info: Mark Walker was born at Tickle Cove, Bonavista Bay South (BBS), Newfoundland, Canada in 1846. His father was Marcus Walker of County Tipperary, Ireland; his mother - Jane Mackey of Bonavista, Newfoundland. Mark Walker moved to Sweet Bay, BBS, in the 1880s where he worked as post master, as well as in both the fishing and lumber trades. In 1908, he and his family moved to Massachusetts, USA. Walker died in 1928.

Aside from "Tickle Cove Pond," Walker wrote other folk classics including "Fanny's Harbour Bawn," "The Antis of Plate Cove," "The Races on Tickle Cove Pond," and a second "Tickle Cove Pond" not long before his death.

Although widely misunderstood in the lyrics, the surname "Oldford" never existed in Tickle Cove until relatively recent years. The surname mentioned in the song is "Over" which at one time was "Ovier." The phonetic misunderstanding and subsequent use of both surnames, as well as other lines, in relation to this song is common.

"Tickle Cove Pond" was first recorded by Canadian folksinger Alan Mills in 1953 and released on Folk Songs of Newfoundland (Folkways Records FP 831).

See also
 List of Newfoundland songs

Canadian folk songs
Newfoundland and Labrador folk songs
Year of song missing